The Oreimo series of light novels is written by Tsukasa Fushimi with accompanying illustrations by Hiro Kanzaki. It follows the story of Kyosuke Kosaka as he learns that his younger sister, Kirino Kosaka, with whom he has had a distant relationship for years, has been living a secret life as an otaku. Now he acts as her confidant and the series follows Kyosuke's efforts to help his sister to reconcile her personal life with her secret hobbies, while restoring their broken relationship and coming to terms with their true feelings for each other.

The first volume was published on August 8, 2008 by ASCII Media Works's imprint Dengeki Bunko, and of September 10, 2021, 17 volumes have been published.


Volume list

See also 
 List of Oreimo characters
 List of Oreimo episodes

References 

Oreimo
Otaku in fiction